Erhard Keller (born 24 December 1944) is a former speed skater from Germany.

Career
Competing for West Germany, Keller specialised on the sprint distances – the 500 m and the 1000 m – and he joined the world's sprint skating elite in 1965. In December 1967, he equalled Yevgeny Grishin's world record on the 500 m by skating that distance in 39.5 seconds and the next month, on 28 January 1968, he beat Grishin's world record, to the very day five years after Grishin had set it.

Keller, studying dentistry at the Munich University at the time, then participated in the 1968 Winter Olympics in Grenoble. There, the "flying dentist" became Olympic Champion on the 500 m (a distance in which he was still the world record holder), making him the first German male Olympic Champion in speed skating in history – before any other East German or West German or German Olympic Champions in speed skating that would follow. He was of course preceded by East-German Helga Haase, who won gold at the 1960 Winter Olympics at Squaw Valley for the unified German team.

In 1971, Keller became champion at the ISU Sprint Championships (the forerunner of the World Sprint Championships). The next year, he became Olympic Champion on the 500 m again (setting a new Olympic record in the process) at the 1972 Winter Olympics in Sapporo. After the 1972 speed skating season, Keller became a professional speed skater and he graduated in dentistry in 1973. After 1974, Keller no longer participated in any international tournaments. He became a professional dentist in Munich in 1975 and only participated for a few more years in national tournaments.

Records

World records 
Over the course of his career, Keller skated 6 world records (his 500 m world record of 38.0 equalling the existing world record; others would equal it too):

Source: SpeedSkatingStats.com

Personal records 
To put these personal records in perspective, the last column (WR) lists the official world records on the dates that Keller skated his personal records.

Note that the small combination was not an official ISU world record event until 1981.

Keller has an Adelskalender score of 180.663 points.

References

Notes

Bibliography

 Eng, Trond. All Time International Championships, Complete results 1889 - 2002. Askim, Norway, WSSSA Skøytenytt, 2002.
 Keller, Erhard. 74 Schritte zum Ziel, Inzell gab mir die Chance. Munich, Germany: Copress-verlag, 1968. (in German)

External links
 
 
 
 Erhard Keller at SpeedSkatingStats.com
 Erhard Keller at DESG (Deutsche Eisschnelllauf Gemeinschaft) 

1944 births
Living people
People from Günzburg
Sportspeople from Swabia (Bavaria)
German male speed skaters
Olympic speed skaters of West Germany
Olympic gold medalists for West Germany
Olympic medalists in speed skating
Speed skaters at the 1968 Winter Olympics
Speed skaters at the 1972 Winter Olympics
Medalists at the 1972 Winter Olympics
Medalists at the 1968 Winter Olympics
World record setters in speed skating
Universiade medalists in speed skating
World Sprint Speed Skating Championships medalists
Universiade gold medalists for West Germany
Competitors at the 1968 Winter Universiade
Competitors at the 1970 Winter Universiade
20th-century German people